The 1946 Vanderbilt Commodores football team was an  American football team that represented Vanderbilt University in the Southeastern Conference (SEC) during the 1946 college football season. In their fourth season under head coach Red Sanders, the Commodores compiled a 5–4 record (3–4 against SEC opponents) and outscored all opponents by a total of 108 to 43.

Two Vanderbilt players received honors from the United Press (UP) on the 1946 All-SEC football team: end Josh North (UP-2); and tackle Alf Stterfield (UP-3).

Schedule

After the season

The 1947 NFL Draft was held on December 16, 1946. The following Commodores were selected.

References

Vanderbilt
Vanderbilt Commodores football seasons
Vanderbilt Commodores football